Sarah Voss (born 21 October 1999) is a German artistic gymnast. She represented Germany at the 2020 Summer Olympics.  She is the 2019 and 2022 German all-around national champion and competed in the 2018 and 2019 World Championships. She was part of the bronze medal-winning German team at the 2022 European Championships.

Personal life
Voss was born in Frankfurt am Main, Germany in 1999. She currently resides in Dormagen and trains at TZ DSHS Köln.

Gymnastics career

2015 
Voss turned senior in 2015 and competed at the German National Championships where she placed sixth in the all-around, fifth on uneven bars, and sixth on floor exercise.  In October she competed at the Worlds Selection Trials where she one again placed sixth in the all-around but was not named to the team to compete at the 2015 World Championships.  The following week she competed at the Länderkampf Kunstturnen where she helped Germany finish second behind Brazil.  Voss finished the season at the Toyota International Cup where she placed sixth on the uneven bars and eighth on floor exercise.

2016 
Voss competed at the DTB Pokal Team Challenge where she helped Germany win the silver behind Russia. She later competed at the Doha World Cup where she placed seventh on floor exercise. Voss was selected to represent Germany at the European Championships alongside Kim Bui, Lina Philipp, Maike Enderle, and Amélie Föllinger.  While there she helped Germany finish seventh in the team final.  In June Voss competed at the German National Championships where she placed seventh in the all-around but did not qualify to any event finals.  At the Olympic Trials Voss placed sixth in the all-around and was not named to the team to compete at the Olympic Games.

2017 
In March Voss competed at the DTB Pokal Team Challenge where she helped the Germany II team place fourth.  In May she competed at the FinGym Turku where she placed second on balance beam behind Tamara Mrdjenovic of Serbia but won gold on floor exercise.  In June Voss competed at the German National Championships where she placed fifth in the all-around behind Elisabeth Seitz, Pauline Schäfer, Kim Bui, and Amélie Föllinger.  Additionally she placed fourth on balance beam.  At the World Trials Voss placed fifth in the all-around but was not named to the team to compete at the World Championships.  Voss competed at the Paris Challenge Cup where she placed fifth on vault and seventh on balance beam.  Voss ended the season at the Toyota International Cup where she placed second in the all-around behind Sae Miyakawa of Japan, eighth on uneven bars and balance beam, and third on floor exercise behind Mai Murakami and Aiko Sugihara, both of Japan.

2018 
In March Voss competed at both the Stuttgart and Birmingham World Cups where she placed fifth and eighth respectively.  In June Voss competed at the German European Championships trials where she placed second in the all-around behind Pauline Schäfer and was named to the team to compete at the European Championships alongside Schäfer, Kim Bui, Leah Griesser, and Emma Höfele. Prior to Euros the team competed at the Sainté Gym Cup, a friendly meet in France, where they placed second behind France but ahead of Switzerland.  At the European Championships Voss helped Germany finish ninth in qualifications but they did not advance to the team final.  Individually Voss qualified to the vault final and finished fourth overall behind Boglárka Dévai, Angelina Melnikova, and Denisa Golgotă.  In September Voss competed at the German World Trials where she placed third behind Bui and Carina Kröll. Later that month she competed at the German National Championships where she placed sixth in the all-around but won gold on vault and balance beam.  In October Voss competed at the 2018 World Championships in Doha alongside Elisabeth Seitz, Bui, Sophie Scheder, and Griesser.  As a team they finished eighth in the team final.

2019 
In August Voss competed at the German National Championships where she placed first in the all-around.  Additionally she placed first on vault and balance beam and fifth on floor exercise.  Later that month she suffered a minor foot injury and missed the German World trials. In September Voss was named to the team to compete at the 2019 World Championships in Stuttgart alongside Kim Bui, Emelie Petz, Elisabeth Seitz, and Sophie Scheder (later replaced by Pauline Schäfer). Later that month she competed at a friendly competition in Worms, Germany where she helped Germany finish first ahead of Belgium, France, and a mixed team.  Additionally she posted the second highest scores on vault and balance beam.

At the World Championships Voss competed all four events during qualification and helped Germany place ninth as a team.  Although they did not qualify to the team final, they qualified a team to the 2020 Olympic Games in Tokyo.  Individually Voss qualified to the all-around and balance beam finals.  In the all-around final Voss finished in tenth place.  During the balance beam final she finished in seventh place.  Voss ended the season by competing at the Arthur Gander Memorial in Morges, Switzerland where she finished second behind Lorette Charpy of France.

2020 
In early 2020 it was announced that Voss would represent Germany at the American Cup, taking place on March 7, and at the Tokyo World Cup taking place on April 4.  At the American Cup Voss finished in eleventh place. Later that month it was announced that the Tokyo World Cup was canceled due to the coronavirus pandemic in Japan.

2021 
In 2021 Voss became the first female gymnast to cover her legs at an international competition for a non-religious reason, when she wore a full-body suit at the 2021 European Championships.  On June 13 Voss was selected to represent Germany at the 2020 Summer Olympics alongside Elisabeth Seitz, Kim Bui, and Pauline Schäfer.  In qualifications at the Olympic Games Germany finished ninth as a team and did not advance to the finals.

2022 
Voss competed at the DTB Pokal Mixed Cup where she helped Germany finish second behind the United States.  She next competed at the Baku World Cup where she won gold on balance beam and placed fourth on the uneven bars. In June, Voss competed at the Osijek World Challenge Cup, where she took the silver medal in the uneven bars final behind Zója Székely, and finished fourth in the floor final. Later that month, Voss won the all-around at the German Championships, and also picked up the gold in the vault final, as well as silver in the balance beam and floor exercise finals.

In August, Voss competed at the European Championships in Munich, where she helped Germany qualify to the team final in fourth place. In the final, the German team of Voss, Kim Bui, Emma Malewski, Pauline Schäfer and Elisabeth Seitz won the bronze medal behind Italy and Great Britain — Germany's first team medal in European Championship history.  In September Voss announced that she would be unable to compete at the upcoming World Championships due to a calf injury.

Competitive history

References

External links

 

1999 births
Living people
German female artistic gymnasts
Sportspeople from Cologne
People from Dormagen
Sportspeople from Düsseldorf (region)
Gymnasts at the 2020 Summer Olympics
Olympic gymnasts of Germany
21st-century German women